Robert E. Walls (born 1941) is an American politician. He was a Democratic member of the Delaware House of Representatives, representing District 33 from 2006 until 2010, when he was defeated by Republican Harold Peterman in the general election.

References

1941 births
Living people
People from Milford, Delaware
Members of the Delaware House of Representatives